Hard Times in America is an extended play musical recording by American singer-songwriter Willie Nile. The EP was released in 1992 by Polaris Records, Inc.

Track listing

Personnel
Musicians
 Willie Nile – acoustic guitar, vocals, piano, keyboards
 Richard Kennedy  – electric & acoustic guitars background vocals
 Frank Vilardi – drums
 Brian Stanley – bass guitar
 David Kumin – keyboards
 Paul Ossola – bass guitar on "Seeds Of A Revolution"
 Martin Briley – guitar & keyboards on "Someday", background vocals
 Steve Holley  – drums & percussion on "Someday"
 Mark Johnson – background vocals
 Frankie Lee – background vocals
Production and additional personnel
 Record producer by Stewart Lerman, Willie Nile, Martin Briley
 Engineered by Dominic Maita, Steve Addabbo
 Mixing by Stewart Lerman, Dominic Maita, Steve Addabbo
 Mastering by Ricky Essig at Frankford-Wayne Mastering Labs, NYC
 Art direction by Dennis Loren
 Photography Patti Mitchell, Kristian Lawing

References

1992 albums
Willie Nile albums
Albums produced by Stewart Lerman